Farragut West is a Washington Metro station in downtown Washington, D.C., United States. The side-platformed station was opened on July 1, 1977, and is operated by the Washington Metropolitan Area Transit Authority (WMATA). Providing service for the Blue, Silver, and Orange Lines, the station is located just west of Farragut Square with two entrances on I Street at 17th and 18th Streets NW.

While it is only a block away (across the square) from Farragut North station, there is no direct connection between the two stations. WMATA originally planned to have a single Farragut station that would serve as an alternate transfer station to ease congestion that would develop in Metro Center. However, it would have been constructed using the cut and cover method, disrupting the square above. Therefore, this proposal was not favored and the two separate stations were built instead. As part of its long-term capital improvement plan dated September 12, 2002, Metro has proposed building an underground pedestrian tunnel (similarly to the connection tunnel between Sofia (Bulgaria)’s Serdika and Serdika-2 metro stations) connecting this station with Farragut North.  On October 28, 2011, Metro announced its Farragut Crossing program, allowing riders using a SmarTrip card up to 30 minutes to transfer for free by foot between Farragut West and Farragut North stations.

The station opened on July 1, 1977. This was the first station in the system to open without any pylons along the platform. Information normally found on the pylons is located on wall plaques. Orange Line service to the station began upon the line's opening on November 20, 1978. It is the sixth-busiest station in the Metrorail system, averaging 18,762 passengers per weekday in May 2017.

Between January 15 to January 21, 2021, this station was closed because of security concerns due to the 2020 Inauguration.

Station layout

Incidents 
At 00:54 on October 7, 2019, two out-of-service trains, both consisting of 3000-series rail cars, collided between Foggy Bottom and Farragut West as both trains were being moved to their respective rail yards, affecting the Blue, Orange, and Silver Lines during the morning rush. Two drivers were injured due to the collision.

Notable places nearby 
 American Legion Headquarters
 Center for Strategic and International Studies
 DAR Constitution Hall
 Farragut Square
 Federal Deposit Insurance Corporation
 International Monetary Fund
 Mayflower Hotel
 National Geographic Society
 The Octagon House (American Institute of Architects)
 The White House
 World Bank

References

External links 
 

 The Schumin Web Transit Center: Farragut West Station
 Farragut West (Washington Metro) is at coordinates:
  17th Street Entrance
  18th Street Entrance
 18th Street entrance from Google Maps Street View
 17th Street entrance from Google Maps Street View

Stations on the Blue Line (Washington Metro)
Downtown (Washington, D.C.)
Stations on the Orange Line (Washington Metro)
Stations on the Silver Line (Washington Metro)
Washington Metro stations in Washington, D.C.
Railway stations in the United States opened in 1977
1977 establishments in Washington, D.C.
Railway stations located underground in Washington, D.C.